

Champions
World Series: Philadelphia Athletics over New York Giants (4-2)

Awards and honors
Chalmers Award
Ty Cobb, Detroit Tigers, OF
Wildfire Schulte, Chicago Cubs, OF

MLB statistical leaders

Major league baseball final standings

American League final standings

National League final standings

Events

April 8 - The Cincinnati Reds, in need of pitching help, sign Jesse Tannehill out of retirement. Tannehill pitches one game, coming on in relief of Art Fromme in the Reds 14-0 loss to the Pittsburgh Pirates. Tannehill is released two days later, ending his MLB career. 
May 13
Ty Cobb of the Detroit Tigers hits his first career grand slam. After six innings, Detroit leads the Boston Red Sox, 10–1. Nevertheless, Boston comes back to win the game 13–11 in 10 innings.
The New York Giants score a Major League record 10 runs before the St. Louis Cardinals retire the first batter in the first inning. Fred Merkle drives in six of the Giants' 13 runs in the first en route to a 19–5 victory. When Giants manager John McGraw decides to save starting pitcher Christy Mathewson for another day, Rube Marquard enters the game in the second inning and sets a record for relievers (since broken) with 14 strikeouts in his eight-inning relief appearance.
May 14 – In their first Sunday home game, the Cleveland Naps defeat the New York Highlanders, 16-3, before a crowd of nearly 16,000 spectators. Cleveland's George Stovall leads the offense with 4 hits.
June 18 – The Detroit Tigers staged the biggest comeback in Major League history after overcoming a 13-1 deficit (after 5½ innings) to defeat the Chicago White Sox by a score of 16–15.
July 19 – former circus acrobat Walter Carlisle completed an unassisted triple play for the Vernon Tigers of the Pacific Coast League. With the score tied at 3–3 in the sixth inning, and men on first and second base, Carlisle made a spectacular diving catch of a short fly by batter Roy Akin; stepped on second to retire Charlie Moore, and tagged George Metzger coming from first. The Tigers won the game, 5–4. With his heroic feat, the speedy English-born Carlisle entered the records books as the only outfielder ever to make an unassisted triple play in organized baseball.
June 28 – The new Polo Grounds, a horseshoe-shaped structure, opens.
July 24 – An American League all-star team – including Walter Johnson, Hal Chase, and Smokey Joe Wood – plays the Cleveland Naps in the Addie Joss Benefit Game to raise money for the widow of Addie Joss. The All-Stars win, 5-3.
July 29 – In the first game of a doubleheader, Smoky Joe Wood pitches a no-hitter against the St. Louis Browns in a 5-0 Boston Red Sox victory.
August 11- The Cleveland Naps release pitcher Cy Young. Young is signed by the Boston Rustlers one week later. 
August 27 – Ed Walsh of the Chicago White Sox pitches a 5–0 no-hitter against the Boston Red Sox.
September 12 – In the nightcap of a game billed as a pitchers' duel, Boston Rustlers' Cy Young and the New York Giants' Christy Mathewson face each other before 10,000 fans, Boston's largest crowd of the year. Young gives up three home runs and nine runs in less than three innings. After the Giants build a 9–0 lead, Giants' manager John McGraw lifts Mathewson, who pitched just two innings, preferring to save his ace for the pennant race against the Chicago Cubs and the Philadelphia Phillies. This is the only time the two future Hall of Fame pitchers ever face each other.
September 22 – Cy Young of the Boston Rustlers pitches a shutout for the 511th and final victory of his career, in a 1–0 victory over the Pittsburgh Pirates.
October 22 – The World Series between the New York Giants and the Philadelphia Athletics was resumed after six days of rain, and Chief Bender beat Christy Mathewson, 4–2, to give the Athletics a 3-1 lead.
October 26 – The Philadelphia Athletics defeat the New York Giants, 13–2, in Game 6 of the World Series to win their second consecutive World Championship title. Philadelphia wins the series, four games to two. The six consecutive days of rain between Games 3 and 4 caused the longest delay between World Series games until the Loma Prieta earthquake interrupted the 1989 Series, which incidentally featured the same two franchises, albeit on the west coast.
December 1 – Future Hall of Fame member Walter Alston is born in Venice, Ohio.
November 10 – Clark Griffith becomes a club owner and president when he joins Philadelphia grain broker William Richardson in buying controlling interest in the Washington Senators for $175,000. Griffith, unable to get financial help from the American League, mortgages his ranch in Montana to raise funds.

Births

January
January 1 – Hank Greenberg
January 4 – Izzy León
January 5 – Ted Petoskey
January 9 – Jim Tyack
January 11 – Roy Hughes
January 14 – Hank Gornicki
January 16 – Hank McDonald
January 17 – Hank Leiber
January 18 – Pinky May
January 30 – Bob Katz
January 30 – Link Wasem

February
February 8 – Rae Blaemire
February 8 – Don Heffner
February 11 – Yank Terry
February 13 – Herb Hash
February 14 – Bill Marshall
February 22 – Bill Baker
February 24 – Nig Lipscomb
February 24 – Johnny Oulliber
February 25 – Roy Weir
February 26 – Bill Starr

March
March 5 – Earl Browne
March 18 – Al Benton
March 20 – Charlie Moss
March 23 – Sig Broskie
March 24 – Jim Bucher
March 27 – Walter Stephenson
March 28 – Clarence Pickrel

April
April 1 – Bob Brown
April 2 – Cotton Pippen
April 10 – Roger Wolff
April 13 – Woody Upchurch
April 22 – Jake Daniel
April 25 – Bobby Estalella
April 25 – Connie Marrero

May
May 7 – Steve Wylie
May 10 – Roland Gladu
May 12 – Archie McKain
May 15 – Howie Storie
May 18 – Al Niemiec
May 19 – Nubs Kleinke
May 20 – Bert Delmas
May 21 – Irv Stein

June
June 1 – Lou Tost
June 7 – Ralph Buxton
June 8 – Van Mungo
June 9 – Frank McCormick
June 17 – Byron Humphrey
June 18 – Russ Hodges
June 25 – Tony Parisse
June 28 – Jim Hitchcock

July
July 7 – Red Nonnenkamp
July 11 – Vito Tamulis
July 14 – Julio Bonetti
July 22 – Lindsay Brown
July 28 – Joe Martin
July 29 – Roy Henshaw

August
August 3 – Art Evans
August 4 – Tuck Stainback
August 9 – Justin Stein
August 10 – Taffy Wright
August 15 – Mort Flohr
August 16 – Herman Besse
August 21 – Tom Cafego
August 22 – Herman Fink
August 23 – Nels Potter
August 25 – Fred Frink

September
September 3 – Lindsay Deal
September 4 – Roy Vaughn
September 5 – Buddy Hassett
September 6 – Harry Danning
September 6 – Vallie Eaves
September 10 – Johnnie Chambers
September 18 – Tommy de la Cruz
September 25 – Bill Atwood
September 27 – Dick Lanahan
September 29 – Dan McGee

October
October 12 – Red Bullock
October 28 – Lloyd Davenport

November
November 1 – Art Parks
November 2 – Red Jones
November 3 – John Keane
November 6 – Frank Gabler
November 7 – Herb Crompton
November 9 – Ed Linke
November 13 – John Mihalic
November 13 – Buck O'Neil
November 16 – Clay Bryant
November 24 – Joe Medwick
November 28 – Bill DeLancey
November 28 – Emory Long
November 29 – Harry Boyles

December
December 1 – Walter Alston
December 1 – Junie Barnes
December 5 – Stu Flythe
December 5 – Don Padgett
December 5 – Dick Stone
December 7 – Denny Galehouse
December 7 – Don Johnson
December 18 – Coaker Triplett
December 21 – Nino Bongiovanni
December 21 – Josh Gibson
December 29 – Bill Knickerbocker

Deaths

January–March
January 18 – Dick Scott, 27, pitcher for the 1901 Cincinnati Reds.
February 5 – Dad Clarkson, 44, pitcher who posted a 39-39 record and a 4.90 ERA for four different teams from 1891 to 1896.
February 18 – Buttons Briggs, 35, pitcher for the Chicago Colts/Orphans/Cubs 1896–1898, and 1904–1905.
March 10 – Guy McFadden, 38, first baseman for the 1895 St. Louis Browns of the National League.
March 12 – Simon Nicholls, 28, shortstop for the Detroit Tigers, Philadelphia Athletics and Cleveland Naps between the 1906 and 1909 seasons.

April–June
April 5 – Frank Hankinson, 54, third baseman and pitcher who played from 1878 through 1888 with the White Stockings, Blues, Trojans, Gothams. Metropolitan and Cowboys.
April 14 – Addie Joss, 31, pitcher for Cleveland who won 20 games four times (1905–08), led American League in ERA twice with a career 1.89 ERA, including one-hitter in major league debut, one no-hitter and a perfect game.
April 23 – George Craig, 23, pitcher for the 1907 Philadelphia Athletics.
April 25 – Jack Rowe, 54, catcher and shortstop for Buffalo and Detroit who batted .300 four times, led NL in triples in 1881; did not strike out in entire 1882 season, later a minor league manager
May 26 – Billy O'Brien, 51, third baseman for four teams in two different leagues from 1884 to 1890, who topped the Nationel League batters with 19 home runs in 1887.
June 3 – Dad Clarke, 46, who pitched from 1888 to 1898 for the White Stockings/Solons/Giants/Colonels, going 44-51 with a 4.17 ERA.
June 23 – John O'Rourke, 59, center fielder who hit .295 in 290 games with the Boston Red Caps (1879–1880) and New York Metropolitans (1883), leading the National League with a .521 slugging in 1879.

July–September
July 4 – Jimmy Mathison, 32, third baseman for the 1902 Baltimore Orioles.
July 26 – John Radcliff, 65, shortstop for five seasons in the National Association.
August 5 – Bob Caruthers, 47, pitcher who compiled the highest career winning percentage among major leaguers with 250 decisions; led American Association with 40 victories in both 1885 and 1889, pacing St. Louis and Brooklyn to respective pennants; batted .300 twice, later an umpire
August 8 – Joe Walsh, 46, infielder for the 1881 Baltimore Orioles of the American Association.
August 31 – Will White, 56, pitcher who won over 200 games for Cincinnati teams in 10-year career, led league in wins and strikeouts twice each; first major leaguer to wear eyeglasses, and batterymate of brother Deacon from 1877–79

September–December
October 1 – Leo Hafford, 28, pitcher for the 1906 Cincinnati Reds.
October 4 – Emil Geiss, 44, infielder/pitcher for the 1887 Chicago White Stockings.
October 6 – Larry Murphy, 54, Canadian outfielder for the 1891 for the Washington Statesmen.
October 10 – Bill Parks, 62, pitcher and left fielder for three teams from 1875 to 1876. Managed the 1875 Washington Nationals for eight games in 1875.
October 19 – Marshall King, 61, outfielder who played from 1867 to 1872 for the Haymakers, White Stockings and Haymakers.
October 25 – Chris Rickley, 52, shortstop for the 1884  for the Philadelphia Keystones of the Union Association.
November 4 – Warren Burtis, 63, National League umpire in 1876 and 1877.
November 8 – Oscar Bielaski, 64, right fielder for five seasons, from 1872 to 1876, who was on the 1876 National League champion Chicago White Stockings.
November 8 – Frank Gatins, 40, infielder for the Washington Senators (1898) and Brooklyn Superbas (1901).
November 21 – William Hepburn Russell, 54, co-owner of the Boston Rustlers from December 17, 1910 until his death.
November 22 – Ed Cermak, 30, outfielder for the 1901 Cleveland Blues of the American League.
November 6 – John Hamill, 40, pitcher for the 1884 Washington Nationals.
December 6 – Ed Glenn, 36, National League shortstop who played between 1898 and 1902 with the Washington Senators, New York Giants and Chicago Orphans.
December 31 – Pete Gilbert, 43, third baseman for the Orioles/Grooms/Colonels American Association teams from 1890 to 1894.

Sources